Kull is a town and Union Council of Kasur District in the Punjab province of Pakistan. It is one of the 24 Union Councils of Chunian Tehsil.

References

Kasur District